Katy Sullivan is an American actress, producer, writer, and Paralympic track and field athlete and US record holder.

Sullivan was born a bilateral transfemoral amputee, missing both lower legs. She grew up in Alabama, pursuing interests in gymnastics, singing and acting, and received a BFA in acting from Webster University's Conservatory in St. Louis.

As an actress, she has performed in The Long Red Road at the Goodman Theatre directed by Philip Seymour Hoffman. She has appeared in television shows and independent films including the award-winning documentary, WALK ON. Sullivan has been seen on NBC's My Name is Earl, ABC's Last Man Standing with Tim Allen, FX's comedy Legit and CBS' hit NCIS: New Orleans and appears as Esther in the 2021 reboot of Showtime's hit show 'DEXTER'. She starred as Ani alongside Wendell Pierce in the world premiere of Cost of Living at the Williamstown Theatre Festival. Sullivan reprised the role of Ani in the Manhattan Theatre Club's Pulitzer Prize winning off-Broadway production of Cost of Living and was nominated for a Lucille Lortel Award for Outstanding Featured Actress in a Play, Drama League Award for Distinguished Performance Award , an Outer Critic's Circle Outstanding Actress in a Play and a Theatre World Award.

She co-created SulliFlinn Productions with fellow Webster Grad, Becca Flinn White. They produce online comedy content, short films and are developing a comedy, Legs, based on their life experiences. They were 2015 fellows at the Producers Guild of America in their Power of Diversity program.

Sullivan is also a four-times US champion in the 100 m. She was among the first bilateral above-knee amputees to compete in the Paralympics in ambulatory track when she ran in the London 2012 Paralympic Games, setting a new American record of 17.33 seconds and finishing 6th in the World.

In November 2015, Sullivan received the Athletes in Excellence Award from The Foundation for Global Sports Development, in recognition of her community service efforts and work with youth.

In April 2018, Sullivan was nominated as Outstanding Actress in a Play by the Outer Critics Circle Awards for her performance in the Pulitzer Prize-winning play Cost of Living. In June 2018, Sullivan won a Theatre World award for her performance in Cost of Living.

References

External links
Katy Sullivan's official site
Katy Sullivan at IMDb

Living people
Webster University alumni
Paralympic track and field athletes of the United States
Athletes (track and field) at the 2012 Summer Paralympics
American amputees
American actresses
People from Tuscaloosa, Alabama
Sportspeople from Tuscaloosa, Alabama
Date of birth missing (living people)
Theatre World Award winners
American female sprinters
Year of birth missing (living people)